Blind Dog is an album of American guitarist Norman Blake, released in 1988.

Reception

In his Allmusic review, critic Jason Ankeny called the album "a fine summation of bluegrass guitarist's Norman Blake's career and aesthetics, a largely instrumental collection of favorites from his own catalog as well as from his influences."

Track listing 
 "Little Stream of Whiskey" (Traditional) – 3:29
 "Grand Coulee Dam" (Woody Guthrie) – 3:43
 "Prettiest Little Girl in the Country" (Traditional) – 2:19
 "Billy Gray" (Blake) – 4:08
 "Otto Wood the Bandit" (Traditional) – 2:43
 "Blind Dog" (Blake) – 2:54
 "Everybody Works But Father" (Traditional) – 3:28
 "Fifty Miles of Elbow Room" (A. P. Carter) – 3:49
 "Shallegra" (Blake) – 2:56
 "Old Time Farmer" (Blake) – 4:37
 "Wreck of the Old '97" (Norman Blake, Johnny Cash, Bob Johnson) – 3:46
 "Black Mountain Rag" (Traditional) – 2:25

Personnel
Norman Blake – guitar, fiddle, vocals
 Nancy Blake – guitar, cello, vocals
Production notes
Bill Wolf – engineer
Edd Miller – assistant engineer
Susan Marsh – design
Senor McGuire – photography

References

1988 albums
Norman Blake (American musician) albums
Rounder Records albums